Fatal dog attacks in England are measured in single figures per year. An increasing number of serious dog attacks (both fatal and non-fatal) was the catalyst for the Dangerous Dogs Act 1991, which banned four breeds: Pitbull, Japanese Tosa, Dogo Argentino and Fila Brasileiro.

A 2021 study of fatal dog attacks in Europe during the period 1995–2016 placed England (with 56 fatalities) as fourth in the top five countries for number of human fatalities alongside Hungary (#1), France (#2), Romania (#3), and Poland (#5). The study also found that fatal dog attacks have been increasing significantly over time which was not attributable to the increase in number of dogs, and stated "The numbers of fatalities are indeed a very small tip of the 'dog attack iceberg', and the number of dog attacks that lead to hospitalizations of the victim outnumber fatalities by several orders of magnitude."

Summary counts of fatalities by year
From the Office for National Statistics (ONS) (England and Wales 1981–2015):

From Department for Environment, Food and Rural Affairs (England & Wales 2005–2017):

Pre-1900s

1980-1999

2000–2009

2010–2019

2020–present

See also
 Animal attacks
 Beware of the dog
 Status dog

References

Canid attacks
Dogs in the United Kingdom
United Kingdom